This sortable table is intended to list railway accidents in the Republic of Ireland, and before its formation accidents in the provinces of Leinster, Munster and Connacht, plus the counties of Donegal, Cavan and Monaghan.  It is currently limited to accidents where at least one train occupant was killed.  It does not include acts of terror, nor accidents in Northern Ireland. 


Irish railway accidents with one or more train occupant fatalities
The 'TRA link' column gives a link to the accident's page on The Railways Archive web site, though some may not yet be fully detailed.

See also
 Railway Accident Investigation Unit
 Armagh rail disaster
 Buttevant Rail Disaster
 Owencarrow Viaduct Disaster
 Lists of rail accidents
 List of rail accidents by country

Notes

References
 
 
 

Accidents
Ireland
railway accidents